KFUM Arena is a football stadium located at Ekeberg in Oslo, Norway, and is the home of Norwegian 1. divisjon club KFUM Oslo. The stadium has a current capacity of approximately 1,500 spectators. KFUM is a translation of the English language YMCA.

Facilities
The arena is owned by KFUM-Kameratene Oslo. It was opened on 19 November 2007. The construction costs were estimated to around NOK 10 million. The pitch itself is 64 x 105 meters and has artificial turf, under-soil heating and an automatic watering system. The stadium is located next to a sports hall; KFUM-hallen. 

In the aftermath of KFUM's promotion to the second tier in 2015, the artificial turf was changed and the stands were upgraded.

There are plans of major upgrades of the existing facilities. The project has been named KFUM Familiearena and will increase the seated capacity to 2,400. The arena will also include a swimming-pool, fitness-center, a kindergarten, indoor football arena for kids, a cafe, offices and meeting areas.

Attendances
The attendance record is as of today at 2236 from the quarter finals in the Norwegian championship in 2019 against Odds ballklubb, a match KFUM lost 2-5. The previous record was 1866 spectators when KFUM met Vålerenga in the third round of the Norwegian Cup in 2016.  Vålerenga won the game 2–0.

Average attendances
This shows the average attendance on KFUM Oslo's home games in one of the two top tiers since 2016, their first season at the second tier since the opening of KFUM Arena.

* Due to Covid-19 restrictions the maximum number of spectators in Oslo in 2020 was limited to 200.

References

External links
 KFUM Arena at kaaffa.no

Football venues in Norway
Sports venues in Oslo
Sports venues completed in 2007
2007 establishments in Norway
KFUM-Kameratene Oslo